Glen Scotia distillery or sometimes affectionately known as The Scotia or Old Scotia is a distillery that is a producer of single malt Scotch whisky. The distillery was founded in 1832 and is one of just three distilleries left in Campbeltown, the smallest whisky region.

History
Glen Scotia Distillery was founded in 1832, and has been operating for  one hundred and eighty years. Situated in Campbeltown, one of the recognised 5 Whisky producing regions of Scotland, the distillery has a formidable pedigree.

Campbeltown is a small town on the Kintyre Peninsula on the west coast of Scotland. It is affectionately known as the “Wee Toon”, and the Victorian Whisky Capital of the World. At its peak in the 1800s, there were 21 distilleries in this small town with approximately 170 distilleries operating at that time in the UK (129 of those in Scotland)
Campbeltown still has 3 operating distilleries: Glen Scotia, Springbank, and Glengyle. These distilleries give a remarkable insight into the history of making whisky in this remote, once prolific, whisky making region of Scotland.

Glen Scotia was formerly known as 'Scotia' when it was first founded in 1832 by Stewart & Galbraith and Company. Stewart & Galbraith Co. ran the Distillery for almost 60 years. Notable industrialist Duncan MacCallum purchased the distillery in 1891 and he constructed the large frontage (Malting Floors) which run along High Street.

The distillery was acquired from the trustees of the late Duncan McCallum by the Bloch Brothers in 1933. Production was suspended in 1942 on account of the Second World War but was restarted early in 1945.

Bloch Brothers was acquired by Hiram Walker and Sons of Dumbarton in 1954. In 1955 A. Gilles took ownership and in 1970 this merged with three other companies into Amalgamated Distilled Products (ADP). In 1987, Ian Lockwood, former group marketing director of Amalgamated Distilled Product led a management buyout of part of the business and the sale included the Glen Scotia Distillery, which operated as Gibson International.

In 2014, the distillery was bought by Loch Lomond Group who have invested heavily in the site by developing the brand, increasing capacity, opening warehouses and developing a distillery visitor centre.

Today, the distillery still maintains much of its original design, including the mash tun, the stillroom and the dunnage warehouse which dates back to the 1830s. Glen Scotia distillery currently operates with a staff of just 8 employees: one distillery manager, assistant distillery manager, visitor centre manager and five distillery operators. The visitor centre is open to the public and runs daily distillery tours and tastings, with a Victorian style shop to purchase the whisky, branded merchandise and other goods.

Product Range

The Glen Scotia range has been simplified down to five core Single Malt expressions:

Double Cask - 46% ABV
15 Year Old - 46% ABV
Victoriana - 54.2% ABV
18 Year Old - 46% ABV
25 Year Old - 48.8% ABV
Glen Scotia's range showcases the typical Campbeltown flavour profile of toffee, maritime influence and a hint of smoke. 

Each of the core expressions have  been designed to keep to an authentic 'Campbeltown Malt style' culminating in the Victoriana where the distillery has aimed to re-create a modern interpretation of classic Victorian Campbeltown Malt. Glen Scotia Distillery also regularly produces 'special' bottlings to celebrate local events, such as the centenary anniversary of the local Campbeltown Picture House.

Each year, for the annual Campbeltown Malt Whisky Festival, Glen Scotia release a special limited release bottling. In 2019 this was a 15-year-old rum finish and 2020 a 14-year-old Tawny Port finish.

Additionally, special releases and other small production run bottlings also exist.

Production

The distillery draws its water from Crosshill Loch in Campbeltown.

The distillery uses unpeated, medium peated and heavily peated malt barley for its whisky.

Glen Scotia has one wash still, with a capacity of 11,800 litres, and one spirit still with an 8,600 litre capacity. The copper pot stills are onion-shaped, with wide and short necks.

There are 9 washbacks within the distillery, these are all stainless steel.  The washbacks that Glen Scotia originally had were more than 40 years old and were made out of COR-TEN Steel.

The current annual production levels stand at around 700,000 litres.

Awards 
Glen Scotia’s whiskies have been recognised in many renowned award ceremonies, such as San Francisco World Spirits Awards, International Wine & Spirits Competition, World Whisky Awards, International Spirits Challenge & The Scotch Whisky Masters.

Glen Scotia was crowned producers of the World's Best Whisky at the 'San Francisco World Spirits Competition' in 2021. The Distillery was also awarded 'Best Scottish Whisky Distillery' at the Scottish Whisky Awards 2021. The first year any distillery has ever won best distillery and best whisky in the same year!

References

Notes

Bibliography

External links
Company Web Site
Scotch Whisky 
Whisky Distilleries
Malt Madness 
Owner's Website

Distilleries in Scotland
1832 establishments in Scotland
Companies based in Argyll and Bute
Scottish malt whisky
Campbeltown